Malgin is a Russian masculine surname. Its feminine counterpart is Malgina. It may refer to

Denis Malgin (born 1997), Swiss professional ice hockey forward
Dmitri Malgin (born 1987), Kazakhstani ice hockey goaltender
Irina Malgina (born 1973), Russian biathlete

See also
Lago della Malgina, a lake in Italy

Russian-language surnames